Snake Run is an unincorporated community stretched along Indiana 168 nearly halfway between Fort Branch and Mackey in Gibson County, Indiana, United States. It is in both Barton and Union Townships.  It is named after the creek which runs through the central part of the community.  Saint Bernards Catholic Church is the heart of the area.

Unincorporated communities in Gibson County, Indiana
Unincorporated communities in Indiana